Der Türmer. Monatsschrift für Gemüt und Geist was the name of a national conservative, Protestant cultural journal, which appeared first in Stuttgart and then in Berlin from 1898 to 1943 and was published for a long time by the Baltic German writer , who lived in Bad Oeynhausen. The name was intended to refer to the tower keeper from Faust, Part Two: "Zum Sehen geboren, zum Schauen bestellt." (Born to see, ordered to look.)

History 
The journal sought to give a view of the entire intellectual and social culture of the present day; since 1902 the "Türmer-Jahrbuch" (Türmer Yearbook) had been published alongside. Grotthuß made der Türmer a central cultural and political medium of the Wilhelminian period. From 3000 (in 1899), the number of copies printed per month climbed to 17,500. In the section "Türmers Tagebuch" Grotthuß attacked the social democracy, court nobility, money aristocracy and industry, which he accused of "Byzantinism",  and "political eunuchy". In 1918, he sided with the old order against the republic and became a fierce advocate of the Stab-in-the-back myth. When he died in 1920, der Türmer was "well on his way to becoming one of the strongest and most dangerous opponents of the Weimar system". Grotthuß oriented himself towards the  movement. His successor was the Alsatian Heimatkünstler Friedrich Lienhard, who steered the magazine into völkische waters. In 1929, the early National Socialist Friedrich Castelle took over the publication and brought in the two völkisch magazines Deutsche Monatshefte and Die Bergstadt. In 1943, the magazine was integrated into the Westermanns Monatshefte. The printing and publishing of the magazine was done by Greiner and Pfeifer in Stuttgart until 1930, then by the national socialist Beenken-Verlag.

Walter Ehrenstein, Hedwig Forstreuter, Stephan Ley, Otto Rennefeld, Otto von Taube, Karl August Walther and Reinhold Zimmermann were among the authors writing for der Türmer.

References 

 Danielle Goubard: Das Frankreichbild in der Zeitschrift Der Türmer (Jg. 1898–1920). Ein Beitrag zur komparatistischen Imagologie Diss. RWTH Aachen 1977

External links
 

1898 establishments in Germany
1943 disestablishments in Germany
Conservative magazines published in Germany
Cultural magazines published in Germany
Defunct political magazines published in Germany
Magazines established in 1898
Magazines disestablished in 1943
Magazines published in Berlin
Magazines published in Stuttgart